The Changing of Times is the third studio album by American rock band Underoath. The album was released on February 26, 2002, through Solid State Records. It is the first album to include guitarist Timothy McTague and bassist William Nottke, the latter leaving the band afterwards along with vocalist Dallas Taylor and guitarist Octavio Fernandez. The album is the best-selling Solid State debut.

Track listing
All songs written and performed by Underoath.

Personnel
Underoath
Aaron Gillespie – drums, clean vocals 
Dallas Taylor – vocals
Octavio Fernandez – rhythm guitar
Tim McTague – lead guitar
William Nottke – bass guitar
Chris Dudley – keyboards
Production
James Paul Wisner – producer, mixer, additional bass, guitar and string arrangements
Alan Douches – mastering at West Side Studios
Dean Dydek – assistant engineer
Mark Portnoy – drum recording at Landmark Productions & Recording Studios
Earl Gillespie – photography
TheHaloFarm – album design

References

Underoath albums
2002 albums
Solid State Records albums
Screamo albums
Emo albums by American artists
Melodic hardcore albums
Indie rock albums by American artists
Albums produced by James Paul Wisner